Shady Lady is a 1945 romantic comedy directed by George Waggner and starring Charles Coburn, Robert Paige, and Ginny Simms. Waggner originally wanted Susanna Foster for the film but she refused it. Ginny Simms sings floor show songs "Cuddle Up a Little Closer", "In Love With Love" and "Xango".

Choreography by Lester Horton.

Cast
Charles Coburn	as Col. John Appleby
Robert Paige	as Bob Wendell
Ginny Simms	as Leonora Lee Appleby
Alan Curtis	as	Marty Martin
Martha O'Driscoll	as	Gloria Wendell
Kathleen Howard	as Butch
James Burke	as	Crane
Joe Frisco	as	Tramp
John Gallaudet	as	Rappaport
Thomas E. Jackson	as	Bowen 
Billy Wayne	as	Fred
William Hall	as Clarence
William Hunt	as Warren
William E. Green	as 	Billy Norton
Chuck Hamilton	as	Carlson

References

External links
 

1945 films
1945 romantic comedy films
American romantic comedy films
American black-and-white films
Films directed by George Waggner
1940s American films
1940s English-language films